Ken Bousfield (2 October 1919 – 25 May 2000) was one of the leading British golfers of the immediate post-World War II period.

Bousfield won a number of tournaments on the European circuit in the 1950s and 1960s, including the British PGA Championship, which is the second most prestigious tournament in the United Kingdom after The Open Championship. He had two top ten finishes at The Open Championship, finishing in a tie for fifth in 1955 and a tie for eighth in 1961. He was past his peak by the time the formal European Tour was formed in 1972, but he played on it until 1976. He played for Great Britain in the Ryder Cup six times (1949, 1951, 1955, 1957, 1959, 1961) and had a 5-5-0 win–loss–draw record.

Professional wins (18)

Regular wins (17)
This list is probably incomplete.
1951 Southern Professional Championship, News Chronicle Tournament
1955 British PGA Championship, News of the World Match Play, German Open
1956 Yorkshire Evening News Tournament (tie with Dai Rees)
1957 Dunlop Tournament, Southern Professional Championship
1958 Belgian Open, Swiss Open
1959 Sprite Tournament, German Open
1960 Portuguese Open
1961 Portuguese Open, Swallow-Penfold Tournament
1964 Gleneagles Hotel Foursomes Tournament (with K Warren)

Senior wins (1)
1972 PGA Seniors Championship

Results in major championships

Note: Bousfield only played in The Open Championship.

CUT = missed the half-way cut
"T" indicates a tie for a place

Team appearances
Ryder Cup (representing Great Britain): 1949, 1951, 1955, 1957 (winners), 1959, 1961
Canada Cup (representing England): 1956, 1957
Joy Cup (representing the British Isles): 1955 (winners), 1958 (winners)
Amateurs–Professionals Match (representing the Professionals): 1957 (winners), 1958, 1959 (winners), 1960 (winners)

References

External links

English male golfers
European Tour golfers
Ryder Cup competitors for Europe
1919 births
2000 deaths